The 12397 / 12398 Mahabodhi Express is Express train in India which runs daily from Gaya to New Delhi and vice versa. It was started by Nitish Kumar, making it the direct train between Gaya and New Delhi in 2003.

Its name comes from the Mahabodhi Temple situated at Bodhgaya in Gaya district  of Bihar.
It is the most popular train for people travelling between Gaya and New Delhi. It is the fastest train in Gaya–Delhi route after Rajdhani Express and maximum speed is 130 km/hr. It mainly carried passengers from Gaya Junction, Anugrah Narayan Road, Dehri-on-Sone and Mughalsarai station.

The train now uses LHB coach since 20 April 2013.

Route & halts

Traction 
Both trains are hauled by a Kanpur / Gomoh-based WAP-7 (HOG)-equipped locomotive from end to end.

Notes

References 

Transport in Gaya, India
Transport in Delhi
Express trains in India
Rail transport in Bihar
Rail transport in Delhi
Rail transport in Uttar Pradesh
Railway services introduced in 2002
Named passenger trains of India